Erps-Kwerps is a village in the Belgian Province of Flemish Brabant and a sub-municipality of Kortenberg. It has an area of 15.94 km^2.

Geography
Neighbouring places are Nederokkerzeel (municipality of Kampenhout), Kortenberg,  (municipality of Herent), Meerbeek and Everberg.

Location
The village is situated on the prolongation of the runway 07R/25L of the Brussels Airport. Its geographical coordinates are 50° 54' 0" North, 4° 34' 0" East.

Farming in the region
Since it is located within the fertile Central Plateau of the Province of Brabant  it is also part of the so-called "Brabantse Groentenstreek", the "Brabant vegetable region". The main cultivation product is Belgian endives.

Parishes
Two parishes exist in Erps-Kwerps, Erps and Kwerps, each having its own church. The church of Erps is named after Saint Amand and the church of Kwerps after Saint Peter. The latter owns a choir of the seventeenth century and a tower of the late Romanesque period. The old town hall at the town square (Dorpsplein) of Erps was built in 1875 after the design of Alexander Van Arenbergh of Leuven.

Transportation
Erps-Kwerps is connected to the railway Brussels - Liège (line 36, HSL 2). The railway station is 2 km from the town centre.

References

External links

Gemeentewebsite Kortenberg

Populated places in Flemish Brabant
Kortenberg